Biciragnostus is a genus of trilobite in the order Agnostida, which existed in what is now Kazakhstan. It was described by F. Ergaliev in 2001, and the type species is Biciragnostus biformis.

References

Agnostidae
Fossils of Kazakhstan